Kirsti Sparboe (born 7 December 1946) is a Norwegian musical performer and an actress. Most of her musical career has been built on participation in the widely-popular Eurovision Song Contest in which she competed three times and scored a grand total of four points.

Kirsti Sparboe was born on 7 December 1946 in Tromsø, Norway. She first participated in the Eurovision Song Contest in 1965 when she was 18, with the song "Karusell", which came in 13th place. She then participated in the 1966 Norwegian pre-selection for the Eurovision Song Contest, with the song "Gi Meg Fri", which came in second. In 1967, her song "Dukkemann" came in 14th place. 

She also participated in the 1968 Norwegian pre-selection, and would have gone on to represent Norway in 1968, but the song she performed ("Jag har aldri vært så glad i no'en som deg") was disqualified after there were accusations that it was a plagiarism of a popular Cliff Richard song called "Summer Holiday." She also covered the winning song of that year, Spain's "La La La", in Norwegian.

She represented Norway once more in 1969 with the song "Oj, oj, oj, så glad jeg skal bli" in 1969, which finished in last place. This song was recorded in four languages (Norwegian, Swedish, German, and French), and years later a "Grand Jubilee" version entitled "Oj Oj Oj, Grand Prix Jubilee", was released.

Sparboe participated in the 1970 German selection for the Eurovision Song Contest after Norway, Finland, Portugal, and Sweden refused to participate for that year. She sang "Pierre Der Clochard", and ended in fourth place. Sparboe also covered 1971's winning song "Un Banc, Un Arbre, Une Rue" in Norwegian, and also 1970's winning song, "All Kinds of Everything". That cover can be heard in the "external links" section.

Since the Eurovision Song Contest, she has released singles mostly in Germany, where she found moderate success. She also showed off her acting talents for a one-off BBC TV Show, Jon, Brian, Kirsti And Jon, in 1980.

Sources 

Short Bio of Kirsti Sparboe in German 
Archived Eurovision National Finals 1956–1969 
BBC Comedy Guide - "Jon, Brian, Kirsti And Jon"

External links 

 
Kirsti Sparboe performing "Gi meg fri" in 1966
 Kirsti Sparboe performing "Oj, oj, oj, så glad jeg skal bli" in 1969
 Kirsti Sparboe performing "All kinds of everything"

1946 births
Living people
Eurovision Song Contest entrants of 1965
Eurovision Song Contest entrants of 1967
Eurovision Song Contest entrants of 1969
Melodi Grand Prix contestants
Melodi Grand Prix winners
Eurovision Song Contest entrants for Norway
Norwegian women singers
People from Tromsø
Spellemannprisen winners
Norwegian actresses